This list of bridges in Wales lists bridges of particular historical, scenic, architectural or engineering interest in Wales.  Road and railway bridges, viaducts, aqueducts and footbridges are included.

List
Bridges are listed under the names used by Cadw, or the names most commonly used, which may be English or Welsh names.  Where a bridge links two counties, it is listed under the first county alphabetically, unless associated by name with a settlement predominantly in the other county.  The original Severn Bridge is not listed as it reaches land on the Gloucestershire side of the River Wye, the road crossing into Wales on the Wye Bridge.

See also
 List of bridges in the United Kingdom
 List of crossings of the River Severn
 List of crossings of the River Wye

Notes

References

Wales
Bridges
 Bridges in Wales
Bridges